William Coghill (-1860) was a pioneer pastoralist and squatter of the Port Phillip District in 1837.

William and John were both retired Master Mariners. In November 1837, William and his two brothers traveled from the Monaro Plains, New South Wales, to the Port Phillip District with partner John Stuart Hepburn and 2000 sheep. By April 1838, the Coghills had established runs at Piangil, Glendaruel and Glendonald near Clunes. From August 1838 until June 1849 William settled at Glendonald station on Coghills Creek, but then moved to Tullamarine.

In 1846 William Coghill, formed the Immigration Society with others including A.M Campbell and G.C Curlewis to encourage labourers to the area. The Coghill family lived on the Cumberland Estate on the south of Gellibrand Hill from about 1845 and became prominent in local affairs, including the establishment of the first Scottish Presbyterian church in the district. William's Sons David and George established their own pastoral properties nearby.

He died on 19 July 1860 (aged 76).

Notes

References

1774 births
1860 deaths
History of Victoria (Australia)
Settlers of Australia
Australian pastoralists
Scottish emigrants to colonial Australia